Listen: The Very Best of Jenny Morris is a compilation of songs by Australia-based New Zealand rock singer Jenny Morris. It includes both of her top 10 Australian hits, "She Has to Be Loved" and "Break in the Weather".  Essentially a repackaging of her previous compilation, The Best of Jenny Morris: The Story So Far with new artwork and a bonus track, "Little Little", a gentle love song to her unborn child, taken from her 1989 album, Shiver.

Track listing

References

Jenny Morris (musician) albums
2004 greatest hits albums